This is a list of statewide public opinion polls that have been conducted relating to the Democratic primaries for the 2020 United States presidential election. The persons named in the polls are declared candidates or have received media speculation about their possible candidacy.

Given the large number of potential candidates, the scores of certain low-polling and infrequently-polled candidates have been combined within the "other" column; their exact scores may be viewed by viewing the footnotes associated with each poll. The polls included are among Democrats or Democrats and Democratic-leaning independents, and do not include Republican-leaning independents. The statewide polls are ordered by the scheduled date of the state's primary or caucus. Open-ended polls are included and marked with an asterisk (*), but closed-ended versions of such polls are listed where possible. If multiple versions of polls are provided, the version used for debate qualification is prioritized, then the version among likely voters, then registered voters, then adults.

Background

The Democratic National Committee has determined that candidates may qualify for the first two Democratic primary debates either by polling at 1% or higher in at least three national or early-state (Iowa, New Hampshire, Nevada, and South Carolina) polls sponsored or conducted by designated organizations (in different regions if by the same organization) published after January 1, 2019 up until June 12, 2019, or by a fundraising threshold requiring at least 65,000 unique donors with at least 200 in 20 different states. Should more than 20 candidates meet either threshold, then candidates meeting both thresholds will be given highest priority for entry into the debates, followed by those with the highest polling average and those with the most donors. The pollsters and sponsors of polls designated for consideration by the DNC are the Associated Press, ABC News, CBS News, CNN, The Des Moines Register, Fox News, the Las Vegas Review-Journal, Monmouth University, NBC News, The New York Times, National Public Radio, Quinnipiac University, Reuters, the University of New Hampshire, USA Today, The Wall Street Journal, The Washington Post, and Winthrop University. Open-ended polls do not count towards the polling threshold.

For the third and fourth primary debates, candidates will be required to meet both polling and fundraising thresholds, with the prior considering only polls between June 28 and August 28, 2019 and increased to 4 qualifying polls at 2% support, now excluding surveys sponsored by the Las Vegas Review-Journal and Reuters; the latter requirement has also been increased, to 130,000 unique donors with at least 400 in 20 different states.

Individuals who have been included in national Democratic primary polls but have either ruled out their candidacy or not expressed interest in running include Stacey Abrams, Michael Avenatti, Sherrod Brown, Hillary Clinton, Mark Cuban, Andrew Cuomo, Al Franken, Eric Garcetti, Tim Kaine, Jason Kander, Joe Kennedy III, John Kerry, Mitch Landrieu, Terry McAuliffe, Chris Murphy, Gavin Newsom, Michelle Obama, Howard Schultz, Oprah Winfrey, and Mark Zuckerberg.

Polling in the four early primary states 
The following Morning Consult weekly poll archive graph depicts the evolution of the standing of each candidate in the early primary states (Iowa, New Hampshire, Nevada and South Carolina) since February 2019.

Polling for Super Tuesday 
The following Morning Consult graph depicts the evolution of the standing of each candidate in the March 3, 2020 Super Tuesday states (Alabama, Arkansas, California, Colorado, Maine, Massachusetts, Minnesota, North Carolina, Oklahoma, Tennessee, Texas, Utah, Vermont, and Virginia) since January 7, 2020.

Primary and caucus calendar

The following dates reflect either the confirmed or expected dates of Democratic primaries and caucuses in 2020. Those for contests in U.S. territories with no date yet set are based on dates estimated by The Green Papers based on past years. The pledged delegate numbers listed below are based on the presidential votes in 2008, 2012, and 2016, as well as the number of electoral votes of each state in 2020. The number of DNC members and distinguished party leaders in the count of unpledged PLEO (party leaders and elected officials) delegates is based on the 2016 Democratic National Convention, while the number of unpledged officeholders (governors, members of Congress, and their equivalents in non-state jurisdictions) reflects their current total. The numbers of pledged delegates do not yet account for delegate bonuses or penalties from timing or clustering.

States listed with a lavender background and an asterisk (*) do not yet have a date set by existing statute. States with a light yellow background and a dagger (†) are set to shift their primary or caucus date following the expected passage of legislation moving the dates of their contests. If not already listed as such, the date to which the contest is expected to be moved is listed in parentheses. Party-run primaries (also described as either a firehouse primary or caucus in some jurisdictions) are listed with two asterisks (**).

Iowa caucus

The Iowa Democratic caucus was held on February 3, 2020.

New Hampshire primary

The New Hampshire Democratic primary was held on February 11, 2020.

Nevada caucus

The Nevada Democratic caucus was held on February 22, 2020.

South Carolina primary

The South Carolina Democratic primary was held on February 29, 2020.

Alabama primary

The Alabama Democratic primary was held on March 3, 2020.

Arkansas primary

The Arkansas Democratic primary was held on March 3, 2020.

California primary

The California Democratic primary was held on March 3, 2020.

Colorado primary

The Colorado Democratic primary was held on March 3, 2020.

Maine primary

The Maine Democratic primary was held on March 3, 2020.

Massachusetts primary

The Massachusetts Democratic primary was held on March 3, 2020.

Minnesota primary

The Minnesota Democratic primary was held on March 3, 2020.

North Carolina primary

The North Carolina Democratic primary was held on March 3, 2020.

Oklahoma primary

The Oklahoma Democratic primary was held on March 3, 2020.

Tennessee primary

The Tennessee Democratic primary was held on March 3, 2020.

Texas primary

The Texas Democratic primary was held on March 3, 2020.

Utah primary

The Utah Democratic primary was held on March 3, 2020.

Vermont primary

The Vermont Democratic primary was held on March 3, 2020.

Virginia primary

The Virginia Democratic primary was held on March 3, 2020.

Idaho primary

The Idaho Democratic primary is scheduled to take place on March 10, 2020.

Michigan primary

The Michigan Democratic primary is scheduled to take place on March 10, 2020.

Mississippi primary

The Mississippi Democratic primary is scheduled to take place on March 10, 2020.

Missouri primary

The Missouri Democratic primary is scheduled to take place on March 10, 2020.

North Dakota caucus

The North Dakota Democratic caucus is scheduled to take place on March 10, 2020.

Washington primary

The Washington Democratic primary is scheduled to take place on March 10, 2020.

Arizona primary

The Arizona Democratic primary is scheduled to take place on March 17, 2020.

Florida primary

The Florida Democratic primary is scheduled to take place on March 17, 2020.

Illinois primary

The Illinois Democratic primary is scheduled to take place on March 17, 2020.

Wisconsin primary

The Wisconsin Democratic primary is scheduled to take place on April 7, 2020.

Ohio primary 

The Ohio Democratic primary was originally scheduled to take place on March 17, 2020. Due to the COVID-19 pandemic, the primary was delayed. Initially, the Governor suggested the primary be held on June 2, 2020, however, further deliberations resulted in the legislature and Governor agreeing on suspending in-person voting, and selecting a mail-in ballot deadline of April 28, 2020.

Kansas primary

The Kansas Democratic primary is scheduled to take place on May 2, 2020.

Oregon primary

The Oregon Democratic primary is scheduled to take place on May 19, 2020.

Delaware primary

The Delaware Democratic primary was scheduled to take place on April 28, 2020, but was delayed due to the COVID-19 pandemic, and will instead occur on June 2, 2020.

Indiana primary

The Indiana Democratic primary was scheduled to take place on May 5, 2020, but was delayed due to the COVID-19 pandemic, and will instead occur on June 2, 2020.

Maryland primary

The Maryland Democratic primary was scheduled to take place on April 28, 2020, but was delayed due to the COVID-19 pandemic, and will instead occur on June 2, 2020.

Montana primary

The Montana Democratic primary is scheduled to take place on June 2, 2020.

New Mexico primary

The New Mexico democratic primary is scheduled to take place on June 2, 2020.

Pennsylvania primary

The Pennsylvania Democratic primary was scheduled to take place on April 28, 2020, but was delayed due to the COVID-19 pandemic, and is instead scheduled for June 2, 2020.

Georgia primary

The Georgia Democratic primary was originally scheduled to take place on March 24, 2020, but was delayed due to the COVID-19 pandemic, first to May 19, 2020, and then further delayed to June 9, 2020.

New York primary

The New York Democratic primary was scheduled to take place on April 28, 2020, but was delayed due to the COVID-19 pandemic, and is instead scheduled for June 23, 2020.

New Jersey primary

The New Jersey Democratic primary was scheduled to take place on June 2, 2020, but was delayed due to the COVID-19 pandemic, and is instead scheduled for July 7, 2020.

Connecticut primary

The Connecticut Democratic primary was scheduled to take place on April 28, 2020, but was delayed due to the COVID-19 pandemic, first to June 2, 2020, and then further delayed to August 11, 2020.

Notes

Partisan clients

Additional candidates

References

See also

 Nationwide opinion polling for the 2020 Democratic Party presidential primaries
 2020 Democratic National Convention
 Opinion polling for the 2020 Republican Party presidential primaries
 Nationwide opinion polling for the 2020 United States presidential election
 Statewide opinion polling for the 2020 United States presidential election

External links
Primary poll tracker from FiveThirtyEight

2020 United States Democratic presidential primaries
Democratic Party